Maharaja Ganga Singh Dental College & Research Centre, located in Sri Ganganagar, Rajasthan, India is a Dental college run by Sarawagi Charitable Trust.

The college is surrounded by a number of neighboring villages which provides the essential clinical material so vital for the training in the field of the life sciences and in turn the health care of both rural & urban population.

The college is approved by the Dental Council of India and is affiliated to Rajasthan University of Health Sciences Jaipur for annual intake of 100 students.

The main academic programme is the five years BDS (Bachelor of Dental Surgery) programme. The course encompasses theory as well as practical teaching and training in various General Medical and Dental subjects.

References

External links
[www.mgsdentalcollege.org Official site]

Dental colleges in India
Universities and colleges in Rajasthan
Education in Sri Ganganagar district
Sri Ganganagar